The Church of the Higher Life is a New Thought church located in Boston, Massachusetts. It was established in 1894 by Helen Van-Anderson.

The Church was the first New Thought organization with a regular leadership and governance.

Sources
Dresser, Horatio. A History of the New Thought Movement. Thomas Y. Crowell. 1919.

Religious organizations established in 1894
Religious organizations based in Boston
New Thought churches
Christian denominations established in the 19th century
New religious movements
1894 establishments in Massachusetts